Hills Creek is a stream in the U.S. state of West Virginia.

Hills Creek was named after Richard Hill, an early settler.

See also
List of rivers of West Virginia

References

Rivers of Pocahontas County, West Virginia
Rivers of West Virginia